The African Para-Badminton Championships is a tournament organized by the Para Badminton World Federation (PBWF) which has now merged with the BWF. This tournament is hosted to crown the best para-badminton players in Africa.

The inaugural edition of the tournament was hosted in Kampala, Uganda in 2018.

Championships

Individual championships 
The table below states all the host cities (and their countries) of the African Championships.

All-time medal table

Past winners

2018 Kampala 
The first edition of the championships was hosted in Kampala, Uganda. Nigeria became the best country in this edition of the championships, having won a total of 7 gold medals and 5 silver medals in the championships.

2022 Kampala 
Kampala would host the games for a second time in 2022 after the 2020 edition was cancelled as a result of the COVID-19 pandemic. The Egyptian team won 8 golds, 2 silvers and 3 bronzes in this edition.

See also 

 African Badminton Championships

Note

References 

 
Badminton
Africa